(), , or  is a traditional Balinese–Javanese snack, similar to a pancake, made of a rice flour-based batter with coconut milk or coconut cream and shredded coconut as an emulsifier.

However, another savoury version also existed that uses fermented  toppings. Different provinces in Indonesia have their own  recipes corresponding to local tastes.

History

This cultural tradition, still in practice, is called  among the Pandalungan village community (the Madurese of Javanese descent) in Bondowoso (eastern Java), called  among the Javanese community in Yogyakarta (southern Java), and called the  among the Javanese community in Pemalang (central Java).

Originating in Java, the popularity of  has spread to neighbouring islands, especially Bali, ᬲ᭄ᬭᬩᬶ in Balinese. This spread was due to Javanese migration, notably during the Majapahit era (14th–16th century) when western coastal Balinese adopted the food as an 'offering snack for the gods' in their local Balinese Hindu rituals.

Variants

The most basic traditional serabi only employs batter made from rice flour, coconut milk, and coconut sugar, cooked on a small earthenware frying pan on charcoal fire. Sometimes pandan leaf juice is added into this batter mixture to add aroma and a greenish color. During the cooking process, sometimes toppings are added to the batter.

Today, a large variants of serabi toppings are used, from a simple sprinkle of sugar, grated coconut flesh, coarsely ground peanuts, to slices of banana or jackfruit, chocolate sprinkles, black glutinous rice, and oncom. Newer recipes use grated cheddar cheese, corned beef, shredded chicken, slices of fresh strawberry or sausage, or even strawberry ice cream. The sauce (or more precisely syrup) to accompany serabi also varies, from the traditional sweet kinca (golden coconut sugar syrup) sometimes with coconut milk, to modern recipes using chocolate, strawberry, or durian syrup, or even mayonnaise or cream cheese for a savoury Western twist.

Both the cities of Bandung and Solo are famous for their versions of serabi. Bandung surabi is drier and firmer with a pancake-like consistency, well known for a rich variety of toppings and recently developed fusion recipes. The serabi from Solo, however, is more traditional and only half-cooked resulting in a thin, crispy crust but a watery center with rich coconut milk taste. A famous serabi variant from Solo is called serabi notosuman.

In Ambarawa, serabi is served with a sweet coconut milk soup and is known as serabi ngampin.

In Semarang, a dish called bubur serabi involves a bubur sumsum (Javanese pudding) with some small serabi doused with coconut milk and liquid brown sugar. It is served in a bowl made from banana leaves.

See also

List of pancakes – types of pancake in all over the world
 – traditional Javanese snack similar to 
 – the Dutch pancake

References

Notes

External links

Indonesian pancakes
Vegetarian dishes of Indonesia
Foods containing coconut
Kue
Street food in Indonesia
Rice cakes